The 1974 Virginia Slims of Houston  was a women's tennis tournament played on indoor carpet courts at the Net-Set (West Side) Racquet Club in Houston, Texas in the United States that was part of the 1974 Virginia Slims World Championship Series. It was the fourth edition of the tournament and was held from September 30 through October 6, 1974. First-seeded Chris Evert won the singles title and earned $10,000 first-prize money.

Finals

Singles
 Chris Evert defeated  Virginia Wade 6–3, 5–7, 6–1
 It was Evert's 14th singles title of the year and the 37th of her career.

Doubles
 Janet Newberry /  Wendy Overton defeated  Sue Stap /  Virginia Wade 4–6, 7–5, 6–2

Prize money

References

Virginia Slims of Houston
Virginia Slims of Houston
Virginia Slims of Houstonl
Virginia Slims of Houston
Virginia Slims of Houston
Virginia Slims of Houston
Virginia Slims of Houston